Kierzki may refer to the following places:
Kierzki, Greater Poland Voivodeship (west-central Poland)
Kierzki, Podlaskie Voivodeship (north-east Poland)
Kierzki, Silesian Voivodeship (south Poland)
Kierzki, Warmian-Masurian Voivodeship (north Poland)